Ming C. Lin is an American computer scientist and a former chair of the Department of Computer Science at the University of Maryland, College Park, where she also holds an endowed faculty position as the Elizabeth Stevinson Iribe Chair of Computer Science.  Prior to moving to Maryland in 2018, Lin was the John R. & Louise S. Parker Distinguished Professor of Computer Science at the University of North Carolina at Chapel Hill.

Research 
Lin is known for her work on collision detection, and in particular for the Lin–Canny algorithm for maintaining the closest pair of features of two moving objects, for the idea (with Cohen, Manocha, and Ponamgi) of using axis-aligned bounding boxes to quickly eliminate from consideration pairs of objects that are far from colliding, and for additional speedups to collision detection using bounding box hierarchies. Her software libraries implementing these algorithms are widely used in commercial applications including computer aided design and computer games. More generally, her research interests are in physically based modeling, haptics, robotics, 3D computer graphics, computational geometry, and interactive computer simulation.

Biography 
Lin did her graduate studies at the University of California, Berkeley before joining the UNC faculty in 1997.
She is the Editor in Chief Emeritus of IEEE Transactions on Visualization and Computer Graphics (2011-2014).   She is currently a member of the IEEE Computer Society Board of Governors and a member of Computing Research Association-Women (CRA-W) Board of Directors.

Lin is married to her frequent collaborator and UMD faculty colleague, Dinesh Manocha.

Awards and honors 
In 2003, UNC gave Lin their Hettleman Prize for Scholarly and Artistic Achievements, and in 2007, she was named as the Beverly W. Long Distinguished Professor. She has won many best-paper awards for her research, and was given the IEEE Visualization and Graphics Technical Committee 2010 Virtual Reality Technical Achievement Award "in recognition of her seminal contributions in the area of interactive physics-based interaction and simulation for virtual environments." In 2011 she was listed as a fellow of the Association for Computing Machinery for her research in geometric modeling and computer graphics, and she was listed as one of the 2012 IEEE Fellows for her "contributions to real-time physics-based interaction and simulation for virtual environments, robotics and haptics".

References

External links 
 Ming C. Lin home page at the Department of Computer Science, University of North Carolina at Chapel Hill
 GAMMA research group at the Department of Computer Science, University of North Carolina at Chapel Hill

American computer scientists
Computer graphics researchers
Living people
People from College Park, Maryland
Researchers in geometric algorithms
Taiwanese computer scientists
Taiwanese women computer scientists
Taiwanese emigrants to the United States
University of California, Berkeley alumni
University of Maryland, College Park faculty
Fellows of the Association for Computing Machinery
Fellow Members of the IEEE
American academics of Chinese descent
Year of birth missing (living people)
Virtual reality pioneers
21st-century American scientists
21st-century Taiwanese scientists
21st-century Taiwanese women